Diogo Filipe Conceição Tavares (born 27 July 1987) is a Portuguese professional footballer who plays for Clube Oriental de Lisboa as a forward.

He spent most of his career in Italy, but never competed in Serie A.

Club career

Genoa
Born in Lisbon, Tavares was a product of Sporting CP's prolific youth system, but never appeared professionally for its first team, moving abroad in 2006 to join Italian side Genoa CFC, where he spent two uneventful seasons which included as much loans.

He spent the 2007–08 campaign in AC Lugano in Switzerland, with the club also receiving from Genoa Alessandro Di Maio, Tiago and Rivaldo González for a total of €500,000.

Frosinone
In July 2008, Tavares was signed by Frosinone Calcio (in a co-ownership deal) for €300,000. The Serie B club used the transfer credit of Salvatore Bocchetti who joined Genoa in June for €2.3 million, in the same predicament. In January 2010 he moved to lowly U.S. Pergocrema 1932, in another loan.

In late June 2010, Tavares was bought permanently by Fronisone along with Salvatore Aurelio, as part of Robert Gucher's deal. At that time half of the registration rights of the player were valued at €800,000, while Tavares was valued at €600,000 and Gucher at €1.3 million; moreover, Selim Ben Djemia's loan had cost Fronisone €100,000 and Gucher had cost Geona €200,000, which cleared any debts for both clubs.

Tavares only appeared in one fourth of the league matches during 2010–11 and only scored once, as his team ranked 22nd and last in the second level.

Como
On 28 August 2011, Tavares left for Calcio Como as part of the deal that sent Simone Fautario in the opposite direction.

References

External links

Gazzetta dello Sport profile  

1987 births
Living people
Footballers from Lisbon
Portuguese footballers
Association football forwards
Liga Portugal 2 players
Segunda Divisão players
Sporting CP footballers
C.D. Santa Clara players
Amora F.C. players
C.D. Pinhalnovense players
Clube Oriental de Lisboa players
Serie B players
Serie C players
Genoa C.F.C. players
A.C. Monza players
Frosinone Calcio players
U.S. Pergolettese 1932 players
Ternana Calcio players
Como 1907 players
A.C. Ancona players
A.C.R. Messina players
U.S. Catanzaro 1929 players
Catania S.S.D. players
A.S.D. Sicula Leonzio players
Swiss Challenge League players
FC Lugano players
Portugal youth international footballers
Portuguese expatriate footballers
Expatriate footballers in Italy
Expatriate footballers in Switzerland
Portuguese expatriate sportspeople in Italy
Portuguese expatriate sportspeople in Switzerland